British industrial narrow-gauge railways are narrow-gauge railways in the United Kingdom and the Isle of Man that were primarily built to serve one or more industries. Some offered passenger services for employees or workmen, but they did not run public passenger trains. They are categorized by the primary industry they served.

Quarrying and mining

Heavy industry

Engineering works

Power generation 

Power stations were some of the last regular users of industrial steam locomotives in the United Kingdom, although most of these were standard gauge. However, several power generation facilities used narrow-gauge railways.

Refineries

Steel works

Zinc smelting

Construction industry

Contractor depots 

Many construction contractors maintained depots that included narrow-gauge equipment in store and under repair. While some of these were temporary locations and often unrecorded, others were long term yards with extensive stock and facilities.

Tunnelling 
Many narrow-gauge lines were employed for short-term tunnelling contracts. Most of these are unrecorded, so this list represents only a few of the many such lines.

City construction 

During the garden city construction boom, several new towns and cities were built using narrow-gauge railways

Land reclamation and river maintenance 

Temporary and semi-permanent narrow-gauge railways were often used during land reclamation schemes

Reservoir construction 

Many reservoirs constructed before the Second World War employed narrow-gauge railways to move equipment and materials.

Power station construction

Road construction

Other construction

General

Water treatment and sewage works

Gas works

General freight

Forestry

Railway works

Other industries

See also 

 British military narrow-gauge railways
 British narrow-gauge railways
 British quarrying and mining narrow-gauge railways
 British narrow-gauge slate railways
 Decauville
 Industrial railway
 Minimum gauge railway
 Tramway (industrial)

References

Bibliography 
 
 
 
 
 
 
 
 
 
 
 
 Narrow Gauge News, the journal of the Narrow Gauge Railway Society

External links 
 Narrow Gauge Railway Society
 Industrial Railway Society

 
Industrial railways in the United Kingdom